Ludovic Albós Cavaliere (born 4 May 1979) is an Andorran ski mountaineer.

Albos, expert accountant and commercial adviser, started working in commercial àrea in 1999, since this year he has been working in different commercial areas as accountant and adviser.

In his free time he practises ski mountaineering, started it in 2006 and competed first in the Gp Vallnord in the same year. He has been member of the Andorran national ski mountaineering team since 2006. Albos placed ninth in the vertical race event of the 2007 European Championship.

His brothers David and Joan are also competition ski mountaineers.

Selected studies career 
 FP2 - Technician administrative accountant
 Graduate in tourism
 Licenciate administration companies

Selected sport results 
 2007:
 9th, European Championship vertical Race
 2008:
 17th, World Championship vertical Race
 2009:
 19th, European Championship vertical Race
 2nd, 2009 La Serrera Ski Mountaineering race
 2012:
 7th, European Championship team, together with Joan Albós Cavaliere
 8th, European Championship relay, together with Xavier Comas Guixé, Guilad Dodo Perez and Joan Albós Cavaliere

Other activities 
2009:
 L.Bordas xtreme

External links 
  at ludovicalbos.com
 Ludovic Albos at skimountaineering.org

1979 births
Living people
Andorran male ski mountaineers